Marko Sušac (born 23 November 1988) is a Bosnian professional footballer who plays as a goalkeeper.

Club career
A much-travelled goalkeeper, Sušac was set to leave Metalleghe-BSI in summer 2019 after a career that led him to clubs in Croatia and Sweden. He left Olimpik in September 2020, after only arriving at the club two months earlier.

Honours
Borac Banja Luka
Bosnian Cup: 2009–10

GOŠK Gabela
First League of FBiH: 2016–17

References

External links
Marko Sušac at Sofascore

1988 births
Living people
Sportspeople from Mostar
Association football goalkeepers
Bosnia and Herzegovina footballers
Bosnia and Herzegovina under-21 international footballers
NK Kamen Ingrad players
HŠK Zrinjski Mostar players
FK Borac Banja Luka players
NK Croatia Sesvete players
NK Varaždin players
NK Imotski players
NK GOŠK Gabela players
Vasalunds IF players
NK Metalleghe-BSI players
NK Travnik players 
FK Olimpik players 
Premier League of Bosnia and Herzegovina players
First League of the Federation of Bosnia and Herzegovina players
Croatian Football League players
First Football League (Croatia) players
Bosnia and Herzegovina expatriate footballers
Expatriate footballers in Croatia
Bosnia and Herzegovina expatriate sportspeople in Croatia
Expatriate footballers in Sweden
Bosnia and Herzegovina expatriate sportspeople in Sweden